Banal may refer to:
 Something that is common in a boring way, to the point of being cliché
 Of or pertaining to the ban (medieval) or banalité
 Banal nationalism
 Banal (film), a 2019 Filipino horror film

People
 A. J. Banal (born 1988), Filipino boxer
 Joel Banal (born 1958), Filipino basketball player
 Koy Banal, Filipino basketball coach

See also 
 Banality (disambiguation)